The Atlanta Braves Radio Network is a 138-station network (97 A.M., 41 F.M. stations + 1 F.M. translator) heard across ten states and one territory of the Southeastern United States that airs Major League Baseball games of the Atlanta Braves. The flagship station is WCNN in Atlanta, Georgia. The primary booth announcers are Ben Ingram and Joe Simpson, who alternate between play-by-play and color commentary on most game broadcasts, with Jim Powell also calling select games.  Chris Dimino and Kevin McAlpin host the pregame and postgame shows. Mark Lemke provides pregame/postgame analysis and occasionally fills in for Simpson on game broadcasts. The engineer and game producer for Braves Network broadcasts is Jonathan Chadwick. Network producers include Keith Ippolito, Kevin D'Amico, Chris Culwell, Sean Nerny, Brandon Joseph, John Radcliffe, Cameron Carruth, and Isiah Stewart.

Due to the large geographic span of the Braves' territory, their radio network has the most affiliates of any team in Major League Baseball. The nearest teams to the north of Atlanta are the Cincinnati Reds, Washington Nationals, and the Baltimore Orioles. The nearest teams to the west are the St. Louis Cardinals, Houston Astros, and Texas Rangers, while the nearest teams to the south are the Tampa Bay Rays and Miami Marlins.

Flagship

Affiliates

Alabama

Florida

Georgia

Kentucky

Mississippi

North Carolina

South Carolina

Tennessee

U.S. Virgin Islands

Virginia

West Virginia

Former flagships

See also
List of Sirius XM Radio channels

References

Major League Baseball on the radio
Sports radio networks in the United States
Radio networks